Blue Water was a British battlefield nuclear missile of the early 1960s, intended to replace the MGM-5 Corporal, which was becoming obsolete. With roughly the same role and range as Corporal, Blue Water was a far simpler missile that was significantly easier to support in the field. It was seen as a replacement for Corporal both in the UK as well as other NATO operators, notably Germany and possibly Turkey.

The missile entered testing in 1962 was generally successful, and praised in the industry. However, when Germany purchased the MGM-29 Sergeant instead of Blue Water, and it appeared Turkey would do the same, the UK government decided to cancel its development instead of continuing to develop a missile that would be used only by their own forces.

Blue Water was a code name assigned randomly by the Ministry of Supply based on their Rainbow Code system. It was also known as Red Rose early in development.

History

Origins 
In 1956 the Corporal missile had been adopted by the Royal Artillery as a battlefield tactical nuclear missile. This missile was liquid-fuelled, thus requiring a large convoy of support vehicles to prepare it slowly for launch. It also required continual command guidance in flight, yet only achieved relatively poor accuracy. Also in use within the Royal Artillery was the Honest John rocket. This was solid-fuelled and could be launched rapidly, but was unguided and had only short range. There was a clear requirement for a missile that would combine the range of the Corporal, the ease-of-use and rapid reaction of Honest John, and a new guidance system with higher accuracy.

This resulted in a 1958 Operational Requirement for a "short-range corps support weapon" that was solid-fuelled with autonomous guidance and requiring only simple support equipment for launch. It also took advantage of the shrinking dimensions and weight of nuclear warheads and so only required a much smaller payload. It was also a requirement that the system should be air-portable through the RAF's standard Argosy transport aircraft.

As English Electric's Guided Weapons Division in Stevenage had been the "foster-parent" for the UK deployment of the Corporal, they were a natural choice to manage the development of its replacement.

Development 
A suitable warhead of 10 kiloton began development at Atomic Weapons Establishment (AWRE). Codenamed ‘Tony’, this was a UK version of the US W44 Tsetse primary. The Propellant and Explosives Research and Manufacturing Establishment (PERME) developed the solid rocket motor based on the successful Cuckoo originally developed for the Black Knight experimental rocket. Initial testing of the engine suggested it would be underpowered, and in 1959 the Ministry of Supply issued a contract to Bristol Aerojet for a new design.

The first test vehicle flew in 1960 from Aberporth followed by full-range trials at Woomera.

Cancellation 
Initial hopes for Blue Water had been optimistic, seeing it as a NATO-wide replacement for the clearly obsolete Corporal. The anticipated customer was the West German Bundeswehr, but there were serious expectations that this would become standard equipment across NATO.

The US replacement for Corporal was the Sergeant. Sergeant was solid-fuelled and generally comparable to Blue Water, although it was more complex and slower to operate and, like Corporal, still required a train of semi-trailer vehicles. It was however promised for delivery in 1961. In 1960 West Germany agreed to buy Sergeant rather than to wait for Blue Water. As this represented the other major customer for Blue Water, and also the likelihood that other potential customers such as Turkey and Italy would then follow this American path, the sales prospects for Blue Water became bleak.

The programme was cancelled on 10 August 1962, as the UK government, whilst still wishing to purchase the missile, was no longer willing to fund the entire development costs itself. The total costs were estimated at around £32.1 million. Additional funding already earmarked for Blue Water was instead directed to TSR-2. This, and other similar cancellations in this period, were a source of considerable criticism for years to come.

At the time, it was suggested that the cancellation was also the outcome of a successful program to better integrate the RAF and Army. The program, started in 1960, aimed to improve air-ground coordination, allowing RAF aircraft to be used more effectively in the close-support role. Blue Water was, to a large degree, a replacement for long-range artillery, a role that was easily fulfilled by the RAF, as long as those aircraft were available to the Army on a timely basis. The need for missile artillery was replaced by the immediately availability of flying artillery. This suggestion is backed by public comments at the time of the cancellation; "there are plenty of nuclear weapons in Europe already, and that TSR.2 could cover many of the targets the army had in mind for Blue Water".

Air-launched stand-off variant 
A number of references claim that a version of Blue Water was designed for air-launch by the TSR-2 strike aircraft in the stand-off attack role. Top secret MoD papers since released reveal that an air-launched version of Blue Water was considered for development, but this development clearly never proceeded.

Description
The fuselage was cylindrical with a tapered nose, without the swelling required for previous large diameter nuclear warheads. The control surfaces were small and of typical English Electric form: four rear fins and four daggerboard shaped all-moving control surfaces at mid-length, indexed at 45° to the tail fins. Guidance was inertial and once aligned before launch, entirely autonomous in flight.

The transporter erector launcher was a modified Bedford RL lorry. Additional launch equipment consisted of an early electronic computer, carried in a Land Rover, together with an alignment theodolite. Missiles were normally to be held under cover until a few minutes before launch, whereupon they would be moved to their launch position and the stabilising jacks beneath the lorry placed in position. These launch positions had been surveyed immediately beforehand, so as to be aligned directly at the target.

Prior to launch, the launch computer was connected to the missile by an umbilical cable. The same theodolite was used to align the on-board gyroscopes before launch and the flight plan settings for the missile were downloaded to it. The launch control vehicle could then move on to prepare another launcher within the battery. Only immediately before launch was the missile raised on its launcher and then fired. Each missile required a remarkably small crew of two, not counting the battery survey team, to operate it.

See also
 List of Rainbow Codes
 Blue Streak

Notes and references

Medium-range ballistic missiles
Abandoned military projects of the United Kingdom
Cold War missiles of the United Kingdom
Nuclear weapons of the United Kingdom